Saif Rashid (born 25 November 1994) is an Emirati footballer who currently plays as a winger for Al Bataeh on loan from Al-Sharjah.

International career

International goals
Scores and results list the United Arab Emirates' goal tally first.

Honours 

Runners-up 
 UAE Division 1 Group A: 2012–13
 UAE League Cup: 2014–15
Winners 
UAE Pro-League: 2018–19
UAE Super Cup: 2019

References

External links
 

1994 births
Living people
Emirati footballers
Association football wingers
Sharjah FC players
Al Bataeh Club players
UAE Pro League players
UAE First Division League players
2019 AFC Asian Cup players
United Arab Emirates international footballers